Pilot Station Airport  is a state-owned public-use airport located one nautical mile (2 km) southwest of the central business district of Pilot Station, a city in the Kusilvak Census Area of the U.S. state of Alaska.

Facilities and aircraft 
It has one runway designated 7/25 with a 2,541 x 55 ft (774 x 17 m) gravel surface. For the 12-month period ending August 31, 2005, the airport had 700 aircraft operations, an average of 58 per month: 71% air taxi and 29% general aviation.

Airlines and non-stop destinations

Passenger

Prior to its bankruptcy and cessation of all operations, Ravn Alaska served the airport from multiple locations.

Top destinations

References

External links 
 FAA Alaska airport diagram (GIF)

Airports in the Kusilvak Census Area, Alaska